Jiucheng Township is a township of Shidian County in western Yunnan province, China, located  south of the county seat and  south of Baoshan as the crow flies. , it has 8 villages under its administration.

References 

Township-level divisions of Baoshan, Yunnan